Alessandro Farroni (born 20 September 1997) is an Italian professional footballer who plays as a goalkeeper for  club Vis Pesaro.

Career
Born in Spoleto, Farroni started his career in Perugia youth sector. As a senior, he player for Serie D clubs Foligno and L'Aquila.

Serie C
In August 2018, he left L'Aquila and signed with Serie C club Matera. Farroni made his professional debut on 18 September 2018 against Rieti.

After one season in Matera, on 31 January 2019 he moved to Reggina. The club won the promotion to Serie B this season. 

With Reggina on Serie B, Farroni was loaned to Serie C club Juve Stabia.

On 8 July 2022, he extended his contract with the club, and was loaned to Vis Pesaro on Serie C. On 13 January 2022 he signed with Vis Pesaro.

References

External links
 
 

1997 births
Living people
People from Spoleto
Sportspeople from the Province of Perugia
Italian footballers
Association football goalkeepers
Serie C players
Serie D players
A.C. Perugia Calcio players
A.S.D. Città di Foligno 1928 players
L'Aquila Calcio 1927 players
Matera Calcio players
Reggina 1914 players
S.S. Juve Stabia players
Vis Pesaro dal 1898 players
Footballers from Umbria